Koxinga Ancestral Shrine is a family shrine built in West Central District, Tainan, Taiwan in 1663 by Zheng Jing, to worship his father Koxinga. 

When Taiwan became part of the Qing dynasty, it was renamed "The Cheng's Ancestral Shrine" (鄭氏大宗祠) and today the official name is "Ancestral Shrine of Koxinga". The complex is traditional and elegant. There is an old well in front of the gate and this is all that remains of the original shrine.

The central hall worships the statue of Koxinga as well as the spirit tablets of each generation of ancestors. In 1771, there was a famous wooden tablet with the character "Three Generations Heritage" (三圭世錫) to prize the virtue of Koxinga's family.

In this shrine, there is also a sculpture of young Koxinga and his mother Tagawa Matsu.

See also
 Chinese ancestral veneration
 Beiji Temple
 Grand Matsu Temple
 Taiwan Confucian Temple
 State Temple of the Martial God
 Temple of the Five Concubines
 List of temples in Taiwan
 List of tourist attractions in Taiwan

External links

 Tainan City travel information

Koxinga
1663 establishments in Taiwan
Historic sites in Taiwan
Ancestral shrines in Taiwan
Religious buildings and structures in Tainan